Peter Campion (born c. 1987/1988) is an Irish actor and presenter.

Early life
Campion grew up in Birr, County Offaly. His family moved to the Dublin suburb of Dartry when he was twelve. He attended boarding school Clongowes Wood College in County Kildare for secondary school where he participated in school plays. He moved to London for drama school, training at the London Academy of Music and Dramatic Art (LAMDA) and going on to graduate from the Guildhall School of Music and Drama in 2010.

Career
Upon graduation from Guildhall, Campion played Galanba in the Royal National Theatre production of The White Guard. That same year, he began appearing on television as Stumpy Doyle in Love/Hate and Dr. Jack Flynn in Raw. He starred in the Edinburgh production of The Lieutenant of Inishmore. He played Ronan McCann in the first and second series of the BBC Two Northern Ireland drama 6Degrees. In 2013, he starred as Packy Kennedy in the Channel 4 sitcom London Irish.

In 2015, Campion made his film debut as George Sheridan in Brooklyn. This was followed by the musical Sing Street and the St. Patrick's Day segment of the horror anthology Holidays. He starred in the Belfast production of The Pillowman.

Campion narrates Irish version of the reality show First Dates. In 2017, he appeared in the EastEnders limited spinoff Kat & Alfie: Redwater and the horror film The Cured.

In 2018, Campion began playing the guest role of Father Peter in the Channel 4 sitcom Derry Girls. That same year, he landed the roles of Joe in the second series of Can't Cope, Won't Cope as well as theatre roles in Autumn Royal and Furniture. The following year, Campion had a recurring role as Mickey Gibbs in series 5 of the BBC One series Peaky Blinders.

Campion played Henry Vickers in the Acorn TV crime drama Dead Still and the teacher Sweeney in the coming-of-age film Dating Amber in 2020, and the Roman consul Libo in the Sky Atlantic series Domina in 2021.

Personal life
Campion lives in Dublin with fellow actress Valerie O'Connor and their two children.

Filmography

Film

Television

Video games

Stage

References

External links

Living people
21st-century Irish male actors
Actors from County Offaly
Alumni of the Guildhall School of Music and Drama
Male actors from Dublin (city)
People educated at Clongowes Wood College
People from Birr, County Offaly
People from Rathmines
Television presenters from the Republic of Ireland
Year of birth missing (living people)